The six great north faces of the Alps are a group of vertical faces in the Swiss, French, and Italian Alps known in mountaineering for their difficulty, danger, and great height. The "Trilogy" is the three hardest of these north faces, being the Eiger, the Grandes Jorasses, and the Matterhorn.

Six north faces

The six great north faces are (sorted by date of the first ascent): 

 Matterhorn, first ascent in August 1931;
 Cima Grande di Lavaredo, first ascent in 1933;
 Petit Dru, first ascent in 1935;
 Piz Badile, first ascent July 1937;
 Eiger, first ascent in July 1938;
 Grandes Jorasses, first ascent in August 1938.

Making the first ascent of each of these six faces was a major preoccupation of the best European climbers in the 1930s.  Gaston Rébuffat, a French alpinist and mountain guide, was the first to do so, chronicled in his 1954 work, Etoiles et Tempêtes (Starlight and Storm).

the Trilogy
Three of these north faces — the Eiger, the Matterhorn, and the Grandes Jorasses – are much harder to climb, and are known as 'the Trilogy' (or the "north face trilogy").

Records

 The first to climb these three faces within a single year was the Austrian Leo Schlömmer, from the summer of 1961 to the summer of 1962. 

 Ivano Ghirardini was the first person to climb "the Trilogy" in winter, solo (1977–78), and Catherine Destivelle was the first woman (1992-93-94) to complete the solo winter trilogy. 

 With the introduction of the concept of enchainment, the next challenge was to climb all three faces in one outing, a race eventually won by Tomo Česen in 1986 at the age of 26, although nobody witnessed his feat; after that , who achieved the feat between 11–12 March 1987 in a time of 24 hours.

 From December 2014 to March 2015, during a project known as "Starlight and Storms", Tom Ballard climbed these six north faces solo, being the first person to complete this feat in a single winter season without a support team. A film chronicling this project, Tom, won several awards at international film festivals.

 On 15 August 2021, with his ascent of the Petit Dru in 1 hour 43 minutes, the Swiss climber  completed a ten-year project to make the fastest solo speed climb of all six faces. He had previously set speed records on the other five faces, with Ueli Steck's 2015 solo of the Eiger north face the only current faster ascent (when Arnold climbed the Eiger north face in 2011 in two hours and 28 minutes it was the fastest at that date).

Gallery

Bibliography
Anker, Daniel (ed.) (2000) Eiger: The Vertical Arena. Seattle: The Mountaineers.

Hargreaves, Alison (1995). A Hard Day's Summer: Six Classic North Faces Solo. London: Hodder & Stoughton.    
Rébuffat, Gaston (1999). Starlight and Storm: The Conquest of the Great North Faces of the Alps. New York: Modern Library. 
Destivelle, Catherine (2003). Ascensions, Arthaud (French)
Destivelle, Catherine (2015). Rock Queen, Hayloft Publishing Ltd

References

 
Alps
North faces
Mountaineering in the Alps
Cliffs of Europe
Mountaineering in Switzerland